Bread is the self-titled debut album by soft rock band Bread, released in 1969.

Bread peaked at #127 on the Billboard Pop Albums chart. The re-recorded track "It Don't Matter to Me" was issued as a single after the release of Bread's second album, On the Waters, and the #1 success of "Make It with You" in the summer of 1970. "It Don't Matter to Me" peaked at #2 and #10 on Billboards Adult Contemporary and Pop Singles charts, respectively.

The album's cover, with whimsical depictions of the band members photos on paper currency, refers to contemporary slang equating "bread" to money.

Track listingSide one"Dismal Day" (Gates) – 2:21
"London Bridge" (Gates) – 2:32
"Could I" (Griffin, Royer) – 3:31
"Look at Me" (Gates) – 2:43
"The Last Time" (Griffin, Royer) – 4:10
"Any Way You Want Me" (Griffin, Royer) – 3:16Side two'
"Move Over" (Griffin) – 2:36
"Don't Shut Me Out" (Gates) – 2:39
"You Can't Measure the Cost" (Gates) – 3:22
"Family Doctor" (Griffin, Royer) – 2:15
"It Don't Matter to Me" (Gates) – 2:51
"Friends and Lovers" (Griffin, Hallinan, Royer) – 3:54

Personnel

Bread
David Gates – Hammond organ, bass, guitars, percussion, piano, violin, keyboards, RMI electric piano, viola, vocals, Moog synthesizer
James Griffin – vocals, guitars, percussion, keyboards
Robb Royer – guitar, percussion, piano, RMI electric piano, recorder, flute, bass, backing vocals

Additional personnel
Jim Gordon and Ron Edgar – drums

Production
Producer: Bread
Engineer: Bruce Botnick
Production supervisor: Jac Holzman
Art direction: William S. Harvey, Coco Shinomiya
Cover art concept: William S. Harvey
Cover art: Abe Gurvin
Design: Bryan Rackleff
Photography: Ed Caraeff
Liner Notes: Barry Alfonso

Charts

Certifications

References

Bread (band) albums
1969 debut albums
Elektra Records albums
Albums produced by David Gates
Albums produced by Jimmy Griffin
Albums produced by Robb Royer